Line 4 (yellow line) is a line of the Rio de Janeiro Metro.

It was completed on 30 July 2016, connecting Barra da Tijuca neighbourhood in the West Zone, passing under São Conrado and Rocinha, to Ipanema. All stations are underground, but when arriving in Barra da Tijuca, trains exit a tunnel, pass briefly by an elevated bridge and go underground again.

At first, the line was only open to those with a ticket to events of the 2016 Summer Olympics and members of the Olympic Family; it was only open to the general public on September 17.

The Government of the State of Rio de Janeiro remains responsible for the expansion of metro network, through Rio Trilhos.

References

Rio de Janeiro Metro
Rio de Janeiro - Line 1